The Brown B-3 was a 1930s American single-seat touring monoplane and air racer built by the Lawrence Brown Aircraft Company. Only one aircraft was built.

Design and development
The B-3 was based on earlier B-2 Miss Los Angeles single-seat racing monoplane. For the day, some advanced features were included such as Handley Page leading edge slots and single-slotted ailerons and flaps on the wing trailing edge. The B-3 was powered by a 290-horsepower (219 kW) Menasco C6S-4 Super Buccaneer inline piston engine. A proposed two seat-variant, the Brown B-3 Super Sport had two seats in tandem under an enclosed cockpit. No orders were received, and the project died.

Operational history
Intended as a long-distance racer as well as a touring aircraft, only one Brown B-3 (NX266Y) was built and sold to Dr. Ross Sutherland from Los Angeles. On October 10, 1943, the aircraft was destroyed in a hangar fire at Van Nuys Airport,  then known as the Metropolitan Airport. 

The Brown B-3 is featured in Flight for Freedom (1943) as the racing aircraft flown by the lead character.  The B-3 is featured as a prototype fighter aircraft in Flight Lieutenant (1942) and crashes out of shot in the final scene. The B-3 can also be seen sitting on the ramp during the scene of Humphrey Bogart's famous goodbye in the film Casablanca (1942).

Specifications

References

Notes

Bibliography

 The Illustrated Encyclopedia of Aircraft (Part Work 1982–1985). London: Orbis Publishing, 1985.

1930s United States sport aircraft
B-003
Single-engined tractor aircraft
Racing aircraft
Low-wing aircraft
Aircraft first flown in 1936